The 1902 VFL season was the Geelong Football Club's sixth season in the Victorian Football League and its second with Henry Young as captain.

Geelong finished the home-and-away with 7 wins and 10 losses, finishing in seventh position. Geelong did not qualify for the finals series. 

The leading goalkicker was Ike Woods with 16 goals.

Playing List

Statistics

Season summary 
In a generally poor season, Geelong finished the home-and-away season with 7 wins and 10 losses. After a decent start with a 4 win and 2 loss record, Geelong's lackluster form led to a poor placement of 7th position. Therefore, Geelong did not qualify for the finals series.

1902 Results

Ladder

References

 Geelong Football Club seasons
 1902 in Australian rules football